John S. Watrous (died 1897) was a politician from Minnesota, and a former member of the Minnesota House of Representatives, representing St. Louis County, Minnesota. Watrous was the first Speaker of the Minnesota House of Representatives, a position he held from the convention of the 1st Minnesota Legislature in December 1857, until the Speaker's chair was declared vacant on March 12, 1858, due to a prolonged absence during which he was handling private business.

Watrous died in 1897.

References

|-

1897 deaths
People from St. Louis County, Minnesota
Members of the Minnesota House of Representatives
Speakers of the Minnesota House of Representatives
19th-century American politicians
Year of birth missing